Itaituba miniacea is a species of beetle in the family Cerambycidae. It was described by Henry Walter Bates in 1866. It is known from Brazil.

References

Hemilophini
Beetles described in 1866